The 1986 Cal State Hayward Pioneers football team represented California State University, Hayward—now known as California State University, East Bay—as a member of the Northern California Athletic Conference (NCAC) during the 1986 NCAA Division II football season. Led by 12th-year head coach Tim Tierney, Cal State Hayward compiled an overall record of 7–3 with a mark of 3–2 in conference play, placing third in the NCAC. The Pioneers made their way into the top 20 of the NCAA Division II poll three times during the season, but each time they lost their next game. The team outscored its opponents 260 to 175 for the season. The Pioneers played home games at Pioneer Stadium in Hayward, California.

Schedule

Team players in the NFL
No Cal State Hayward Pioneers players were selected in the 1987 NFL Draft.

The following finished their college career in 1986, were not drafted, but played in the NFL.

Notes

References

Cal State Hayward
Cal State Hayward Pioneers football seasons
Cal State Hayward Pioneers football